"A Place to Fall Apart" is a song co-written and recorded by American country music artist Merle Haggard as a duet with Janie Fricke and backed by The Strangers.  It was released in October 1984 as the second single from the album It's All in the Game.  The song was the first single where both Haggard and Fricke worked together.  The single went to number one for one week and spent a total of fourteen weeks on the country chart.  Haggard wrote the song with Willie Nelson and Freddy Powers.

Personnel
Merle Haggard– vocals, guitar, fiddle

The Strangers:
Roy Nichols - lead guitar
Norm Hamlet – steel guitar
Tiny Moore – fiddle, mandolin
Mark Yeary – keyboards
Dennis Hromek - bass
Biff Adams - drums
Jim Belken – fiddle
Don Markham – horns

Chart performance

References

1984 singles
Merle Haggard songs
Janie Fricke songs
Male–female vocal duets
Songs written by Merle Haggard
Songs written by Willie Nelson
Song recordings produced by Ray Baker (music producer)
Epic Records singles
1984 songs
Songs written by Freddy Powers